The Bihari–LaSalle inequality, was proved by the American mathematician
Joseph P. LaSalle (1916–1983) in 1949 and by the Hungarian mathematician
Imre Bihari (1915–1998) in 1956. It is the following nonlinear generalization of Grönwall's lemma.

Let u and ƒ be non-negative continuous functions defined on the half-infinite ray [0, ∞), and let w be a continuous non-decreasing function defined on [0, ∞) and w(u) > 0 on (0, ∞). If u satisfies the following integral inequality,

 

where α is a non-negative constant, then

 

where the function G is defined by

 

and G−1 is the inverse function of G and T is chosen so that

References

Differential equations
Inequalities